Sonora is a municipality located in the Brazilian state of Mato Grosso do Sul. Its population was 19,721 (2020) and its area is 4,075 km².

References

Municipalities in Mato Grosso do Sul